Chelsea Johnson (born December 20, 1983 in Atascadero, California) is a former American pole vaulter. She is the daughter of Jan Johnson, who won three NCAA championships and a bronze medal in the pole vault at the 1972 Summer Olympics. She won the silver medal at the 2009 World Championships in Athletics, but retired from the sport two years later.

Career 
Coached by her father while at Atascadero High School in central California, Chelsea won the pole vault at the 2002 CIF California State Meet. Two years earlier she had placed fifth in the 300 hurdles, behind future World Championship performers Lashinda Demus and Nichole Denby.

As a college athlete at UCLA, Johnson is a two-time NCAA champion, having won the pole vault at the 2004 NCAA Track and Field Championship and the 2006 NCAA Indoor Track and Field Championship.
 
At the 2009 World Athletics Championships in Berlin, Johnson tied for silver alongside Monika Pyrek of Poland with a jump of 4.65 metres. The following year, she won at the Millrose Games and was selected for the 2010 World Indoor Championships. Johnson did not qualify to compete in the pole vault final, finishing in 11th place in the qualification round.

She decided to retire from the sport at the age of 27, saying that her enthusiasm for competition had waned.

Personal bests

References

External links 

 
 
 Player Bio: Chelsea Johnson - Women's Track - UCLA official athletic site

1983 births
Living people
American female pole vaulters
Track and field athletes from California
People from Atascadero, California
Sportspeople from Southern California
UCLA Bruins women's track and field athletes
World Athletics Championships medalists